During the 2000–01 English football season, Crystal Palace F.C. competed in the Football League First Division.

Season summary
Singapore financer Jerry Lim purchased an almost bankrupt Crystal Palace in July 2000, and immediately sold the club to mobile phone tycoon and lifelong fan Simon Jordan who, following defeats to non-league sides in pre-season, replaced Coppell with Alan Smith – who had previously been manager from 1993 to 1995. The takeover solved Palace's financial problems, but their on-the-field form slumped and despite reaching the League Cup semi-finals, Smith was sacked in April 2001 with relegation to Division Two looking imminent. With two away games remaining, at Portsmouth and Stockport County, Palace were in 22nd place, three points behind Portsmouth (with an inferior goal difference) and having played a game more, and four points behind Huddersfield (who had played the same number of games and had a superior goal difference). Long serving coach Steve Kember was put in temporary charge of the first team alongside Terry Bullivant, and after making changes to the playing side, Palace travelled to Portsmouth and came away with a much needed 4–2 victory. When the last day of the season arrived, Palace were in 21st place, one goal better off than Portsmouth. With 87 minutes of the game at Stockport gone, the score was 0–0, a result that would have resulted in Palace's relegation, but Dougie Freedman burst into the Stockport County penalty area and lashed a shot past Stockport 'keeper Lee Jones into the back of the net, triggering the relegation of Huddersfield Town and saving Palace. The goal was controversial, as there had been a clear handball by Palace midfielder David Hopkin just moments before, which the referee had not awarded a free-kick for. Still, the Palace fans didn't care, and many of the 3,000 who had travelled poured onto Stockport's Edgeley Park pitch, celebrating with the players.

Final league table

Results
Crystal Palace's score comes first

Legend

Football League First Division

FA Cup

League Cup

Players

First-team squad
Squad at end of season

Left club during season

References

Notes

Crystal Palace F.C. seasons
Crystal Palace